Roberto Cota (born 13 July 1968 in Novara) is an Italian politician, President of Piedmont from 2010 to 2014.

After a degree in law, Cota joined the party in 1990. In 2000 he was elected to the Regional Council of Piedmont and was President of it until 2005. In 2001 he was elected regional secretary of Lega Nord Piemont.

After having served as Under-Secretary of Productive Activities in Berlusconi II Cabinet (since the end of December 2004) and later in Berlusconi III Cabinet, he was first elected to the Italian Chamber of Deputies in 2006. Re-elected in 2008, he was elected floor leader of Lega Nord in the Chamber.

On 30 March 2010 he was elected President of the Piedmont Region. On 17 June 2010 he resigned from Italian Chamber of Deputies.

His election as president of the Piedmont was canceled on 11 February 2014.

References

1968 births
Living people
People from Novara
University of Milan alumni
Members of the Regional Council of Piedmont
Deputies of Legislature XV of Italy
Deputies of Legislature XVI of Italy
Deputies of Legislature XVII of Italy
Presidents of Piedmont
Lega Nord politicians
Forza Italia (2013) politicians
20th-century Italian lawyers
21st-century Italian lawyers
20th-century Italian politicians
21st-century Italian politicians